The brown-rumped bunting (Emberiza affinis) is a species of bird in the family Emberizidae found in Africa from Senegal to Sudan and Uganda. Its natural habitat is subtropical or tropical moist lowland forests.
Recent (2022) sightings have frequently taken place in Namibia, Ovamboland, Uukwaluudhi. This may be due to climate change.

References

brown-rumped bunting
Birds of Sub-Saharan Africa
brown-rumped bunting
Taxa named by Theodor von Heuglin
Taxonomy articles created by Polbot